Arthur White is an American former Negro league pitcher who played in the 1930s.

White made his Negro leagues debut in 1934 with the Newark Dodgers. He went on to play for the Bacharach Giants in 1936.

References

External links
 and Seamheads

Year of birth missing
Place of birth missing
Bacharach Giants players
Newark Dodgers players
Baseball pitchers